Niviarsiat is a mountain in King Christian X Land, Northeast Greenland. Administratively it is part of the Northeast Greenland National Park zone.

Geography
This mountain rises at the NE end of Suess Land in a bend of the Antarctic Sound, a southern branch of Kaiser Franz Joseph Fjord. It was named by Lauge Koch during his 1926–27 expedition to East Greenland.

See also
 List of mountains in Greenland

References

Mountains of Greenland